RMJM (Robert Matthew Johnson Marshall) is one of the largest architecture and design networks in the world. Services include architecture, development management, engineering, interior design, landscape design, lead consultancy, master planning, product design, specialist advisory services, urban design. The network caters to a wide range of clients in sectors including mixed-use, education, healthcare, energy, residential, government and hospitality. Specific services are also available through global PRO studios: RMJM Sport, RMJM Healthcare, RMJM DX and RMJM PIM. 

Founded in 1956 by architects Robert Matthew and Stirrat Johnson-Marshall, RMJM’s first offices were based in London and Edinburgh. RMJM has been a strong proponent of modern and contemporary architecture inspired by cultures around the globe since its conception.

History
RMJM was founded by Stirrat Johnson-Marshall and Robert Matthew in 1956. The partnership began following Robert Matthew’s decision to hire Johnson-Marshall to manage the new London office of his architecture practice, which had been set up to oversee the construction of New Zealand House in Haymarket Road, London, described as "London's most distinguished 1960s office block".

In 1961, the firm took Tom Spaven, Kenneth Graham, Vernon Lee, John Richards, Chris Carter, and Alan Whiteman into partnership. As a result, the practice changed its name to RMJM & Partners. The change in name also marked a shift towards larger international projects; by 1967 the practice employed 350 members of staff between the Edinburgh and London offices.

RMJM began to take on more projects as the need for public sector construction grew, expanding to include a Glasgow studio before extending its reach beyond the British borders.
In the late 1960s, the firm began working on projects in the United States. Further projects in the Middle East and Central Asia saw RMJM establish several more international studios in the following decades.

Over the next 20 years, RMJM continued to expand and the firms modernist, functional style became a trademark. As RMJM moved further into the emerging markets of the Middle East, East Asia, and Africa, it began to establish more offices within the respective countries. Around 2010, management difficulties meant the RMJM workforce shrunk while they were subject to lawsuits and other challenges with their international studios Between 2011 and 2019, the company saw a change in its fortunes as it began to expand its services once more. 2014 saw the firm renew their relationship with the Commonwealth Games by taking on the role of masterplanners for the City Legacy Consortium, developing 700 homes in the City of Glasgow's  Commonwealth Athletes Village. In 2016, RMJM announced the creation of its first "PRO" studios with the capacity to provide sector-specific services, known as RMJM Sport and RMJM Healthcare.  In the last decade RMJM has been commissioned for a number of significant projects including The Lakhta Center, the Gate to the East, Iran Historical Car Museum, Evolution Tower and Sheremetyevo Airport's North Terminal Complex.

Locations
Africa: Nairobi, Kenya; Mombasa, Kenya; Kampala, Uganda; Dar es Salaam, Tanzania; Gaborone, Botswana; Pretoria, South Africa
 
Americas: New York City, USA; Sao Paulo, Brazil; Curitiba, Brazil
 
Asia: Karachi, Pakistan; Shanghai, PRC; Shenzhen, PRC; Hong Kong; Singapore
 
Europe: Valletta, Malta; Rome, Milan, Italy; Ostrava, Czech Rupublic; Belgrade, Serbia; Istanbul, Turkey
 
Middle East: Dubai, UAE; Tehran, Iran

Sector Specific: Sport; Healthcare; PIM; DX

Notable projects 

 Royal Commonwealth Pool, Edinburgh, United Kingdom
 Falkirk Wheel, Falkirk, United Kingdom
 Islamabad Masterplan, Islamabad, Pakistan
 New Zealand House, London, United Kingdom
 Holy Area Development Project, Mecca, Kingdom of Saudi Arabia
 Scottish National Gallery of Modern Art, Edinburgh, United Kingdom
 Scottish Parliament, Edinburgh, United Kingdom
 Khoo Teck Puat Hospital, Singapore
 China National Convention Centre, Beijing, China
 Abu Dhabi National Exhibition Centre, Abu Dhabi, UAE
 Varyap Meridian, Istanbul, Turkey
 Commonwealth Games Athlete's Village, Glasgow, United Kingdom
 DHA City, Karachi, Pakistan
 Sheremetyevo International Airport North Terminal Complex, Moscow, Russia
 Evolution Tower, Moscow, Russia
 Gate to the East, Suzhou, China
 Lakhta Center, Saint-Petersburg, Russia
 Zhuahi Tower, Zhuhai, China
 Capital Gate, Abu Dhabi, UAE
 Gate Avenue, Dubai, UAE
 Metropol Istanbul, Istanbul, Turkey
 Shenzhen Metro Line 6, Shenzhen, China
 Dubai International Convention and Exhibition Centre, Dubai, UAE
 China Merchants Bank Tower, Shanghai, China
 Belgrade Waterfront, Belgrade, Serbia

Awards

Financial Times Industrial Architecture Award, 1968, Power Station, Cockenzie
Civic Trust Award, 1968, Pathfoot Building, University of Stirling
RIBA Regional Award, 1970, Royal Commonwealth Pool, Edinburgh
Saltire Award, 1970, Housing at Scotstoun Park, South Queensferry
Civic Trust European Architecture Heritage Year Award, 1975, RMJM Offices, Edinburgh
American Institute of Architects Awards, 1983, New Jersey Highway Authority Office Complex, New Jersey
Queens Award for Export Achievement, 1983
RSA Gold Medal for Architecture, 1994
Dynamic Place Award- Supreme Award, 2003, Falkirk Wheel Boatlift, Falkirk
RIBA Stirling Prize, 2005, The Scottish Parliament, Edinburgh
Construction Week's "Project of the Year" Award, 2008, Abu Dhabi National Exhibition Centre, Abu Dhabi
AIA Hong Kong Awards 'Merit Award for Architecture', 2009, Evian Town, Hong Kong
Futurarc Green Leadership Awards, 2011, Khoo Teck Puat Hospital, Singapore
Green Excellency Award, Pakistan Green Building Council, 2016, DHA City Karachi, Pakistan
International Airport Review Awards Finalist, 2018, Sheremetyevo Airport Terminal B, Moscow
2020 CTBUH Awards of Excellence for "Best Tall Building 400 Meters and Above", 2019, Lakhta Center, St Petersburg
Construction Week Awards- Construction Executive of the Year Finalist, 2019

Gallery

References

External links

 

Design companies established in 1956
1956 establishments in Scotland
Architecture firms of Scotland
Companies based in Edinburgh
Stirling Prize laureates